Rhodoprasina is a genus of moths in the family Sphingidae erected by Walter Rothschild and Karl Jordan in 1903.

Species
Rhodoprasina callantha Jordan 1929
Rhodoprasina corolla Cadiou & Kitching 1990
Rhodoprasina corrigenda Kitching & Cadiou 1996
Rhodoprasina floralis (Butler 1876)
Rhodoprasina koerferi Brechlin, 2010
Rhodoprasina mateji Brechlin & Melichar, 2006
Rhodoprasina nanlingensis Kishida & Wang, 2003
Rhodoprasina nenulfascia Zhu & Wang 1997
Rhodoprasina viksinjaevi Brechlin, 2004
Rhodoprasina winbrechlini Brechlin 1996

References

 
Smerinthini
Moth genera
Taxa named by Walter Rothschild
Taxa named by Karl Jordan